Giovanni Andrea Archetti (11 September 1731 – 5 November 1805) was an Italian Roman Catholic Cardinal.

Biography
Born in Brescia, Lombardy, Archetti studied canon and civil law in La Sapienza University of  Rome. He was ordained priest on 10 September 1775, elected  titular archbishop of Chalcedon (Calcedonia) on the next day, and named Apostolic nuncio in Poland on September 18, 1775. He was instrumental in the failure of the Zamoyski Code.

Archetti was made cardinal priest in the consistory of 20 September 1784 by Pope Pius VI, with the title of Sant'Eusebio and appointed apostolic legate in Bologna the following year. He was transferred to the see of Ascoli Piceno with personal title of archbishop on 1 June 1795. He took part in the Papal conclave of 1799/1800 in Venice. On 2 April 1800 he was named cardinal bishop of the suburbicarian diocese of Sabina, retaining the see of Ascoli Piceno.

He died in 1805 in Ascoli.

References

Books and articles

External links
The Cardinals of the Holy Roman Church-The Biographical Dictionary
Catholic Hierarchy data for this cardinal 

1731 births
1805 deaths
Religious leaders from Brescia
18th-century Italian Roman Catholic titular archbishops
19th-century Italian Roman Catholic titular archbishops
Bishops in le Marche
18th-century Italian cardinals
Cardinal-bishops of Sabina
Apostolic Nuncios to Poland
19th-century Italian cardinals